William Anthony Harris (born November 26, 1950) FRS FMedSci is a Canadian-born neuroscientist, Professor of Anatomy at Cambridge University, and fellow of Clare College, Cambridge.  He was head of the Department of Physiology, Development and Neuroscience since its formation in 2006  until his retirement in 2018.

Awards and honours
He was elected a Fellow of the Royal Society in 2007, a Fellow of the Academy of Medical Sciences in 2007, and a member of the European Molecular Biology Organisation in 2012.  In 2017, he was awarded the Waddington Medal by the British Society for Developmental Biology for his work on the development of the visual system.

Bibliography

References

External links
 http://www.pdn.cam.ac.uk/staff/harris/
 http://www.neuroscience.cam.ac.uk/directory/profile.php?harris
 http://thenode.biologists.com/waddington2017/societies/
 https://press.princeton.edu/books/hardcover/9780691211312/zero-to-birth

1950 births
Fellows of the Royal Society
Fellows of the Academy of Medical Sciences (United Kingdom)
Fellows of Clare College, Cambridge
Living people
Canadian neuroscientists
British neuroscientists
Professors of Anatomy (Cambridge)